The People's Federative Party (Bulgarian Section) was a Bulgarian political party in the Ottoman Empire, created after the Young Turk Revolution, by members of the left wing of the Internal Macedonian Adrianople Revolutionary Organization (IMARO).  The party functioned for one year from August 1909 until August 1910. The Party decided to name itself Bulgarian Section, since it was hoped that other nationalities from European Turkey would adopt its program  and form their own ethnic sections, but this didn't happen. Its main political rival was the Union of the Bulgarian Constitutional Clubs.

Origins 
The Kyustendil congress of IMARO in 1908 led to a disintegration of the organization - Yane Sandanski and Hristo Chernopeev contacted the Young Turks and started legal operation. After the disintegration of IMARO, the two first tried to set up the Macedonian-Adrianople Revolutionary Organization (MARO). Initially, the group developed only propaganda activities, until Sandanski was injured by Tane Nikolov on September 24, 1908, in an attempt for the former's life. Later, the congress for MARO's official inauguration failed. Sandanski and Chernopeev abandoned the idea of MARO, and they started to work towards a creation of the Peoples' Federative Party. On July 18, 1909, Sandaski proclaimed the "Manifesto to all peoples in the empire", a work probably written by Dimo Hadzhidimov. In 1909 the group around Sandanski and Chernopeev participated in the rally of the Young Turks to Istanbul that led to the deposition of sultan Abdul Hamid II from the throne.

Inauguration 

The inauguration meeting of the party was held from August 3 to August 10, 1909 in cafe "Spledit Palace" in Solun. The representatives of 15 local organization attended the congress - H. Yankov and Dimitar Vlahov - Solun, H. Mendikarov and T. Klifov - Gorni Poroy, Stoyko Hadzhiev and Iliya Bizhev - Valovishta, Yane Sandanski and Georgi Kazepov - Melnik, S. Pashkulov and A. Bozhikov - Nevrokop, D.Koshtanov and G. Zahariev - Gorna Dzhumaya, G. Ognyanov - Maleshevsko, K. Samardzhiev and Hristo Chernopeev - Strumitsa, Pande Popmanushev - Petrich, M Goshev and D. Miraschiev - Veles, D. Daskalov and L. Lazarov - Tikvesh, I. Ilyukliev and N. Petrov - Kukush, I. Manolev - Bitolya, Y. Shurkov and F. Bayruaktarov - Skopje, Georgi Strizhovski and Elzov - Razlog, Spasov and Stambonliev - Ser, Todor Panitsa - Drama, A. Kirov - the region around Adrianople, B. Hristov - Dolni Poroy and G. Mihov - Ohrid.
As it is described in some of the party's official documents, it stood behind "the interests of the majority of the Bulgarian population - land owners that do not get state support, small land owners, craftsmen and small merchants." A major goal of the organization was the reform of the Ottoman Empire into a federation, which included a creation of autonomous vilaets in Macedonia, Albania, Armenia. Six committees were organized throughout the party's existence. The party's agenda was maintained by a committee that included Sandanski, Dimitar Vlahov, Dimitar Kostanov and I. Manolov. The party's central committee consisted of A. Matliev, Dimitar Vlahov and H. Yankov, and with advisors Aleksandar Buynov, D. Daskalov, Dimitar Kostanov, Yane Sandanski, Hristo Chernopeev and Y. Shurkov.

Activity 
As deputies of the PFP (Bulgarian Section) were voted Dimitar Vlahov and Hristo Dalchev. Dimitar Vlahov was also the chief editor of the newspaper "Narodna Volya" (Peoples' Will). Dimo Hadzhidimov organized the newspaper "Konstitutsionna Zarya" (Constitutional Reveille), which was issued in Turkish, French and Bulgarian. There was a rift within the party on the role of the Bulgarian Exarchate. The Young Turks expressed desires for its abolition. Yane Sandanski was personally involved in the defense of the church. The newspaper "Rabotnicheska Iskra" (Worker's Spark), organized by Vasil Glavinov described the two rivaling ethnic Bulgarian parties in the Ottoman Empire at the time, the PFP (Bulgarian Section) and the Union of the Bulgarian Constitutional Clubs. According to the newspaper, both of the parties, the former a defender of the poorer Bourgeois, the latter - of the richer, were nationalist and were led by desires of unification with Bulgaria. The regions in which PFP (Bulgarian Section) was most popular were in and around Strumitsa, Ser and Drama.

Dissolution 
In January 1910 Hristo Chernopeev and some of his followers left the party and  founded the Bulgarian People's Macedonian-Adrianople Revolutionary Organization.  Around the same the central committee, led by Dimitar Vlahov, voted Yane Sandanski out of the organization. A new central committee was formed with Dr. H. Tenchev as its president and members D. Miraschiev, Chudomir Kantardzhiev, Aleksandar Buynov and Atanas Spasov. In August 1910 the party was banned by the Ottoman authorities.

See also
Kostadin Alakushev

Sources 
 Стравот и желбите на македонизмот во карантин (The Complaints of Macedonism are in quarantine) (in Macedonian)
 Българското национално дело през време на Хуриета (The Bulgarian National Problem during the Second Constitutional Era (in Bulgarian)
 Димитър Влахов, Борбите на македонския народ за освобождение (Dimitar Vlahov, Struggle of the Macedonian peoples for liberation (in Bulgarian)
 "Димо Хаджидимов. Живот и дело", Боян Кастелов, София, 1985 (Dimo Hadzhidimov, Life and Deeds, Boyan Kastelov, Sofia, 1985) (in Bulgarian)
 Антони Гиза,Балканските държави и македонският въпрос (Antoni Giza, The Balkan Nations and the Macedonian Question) (in Bulgarian)

Notes 

Modern history of Bulgaria
Macedonia under the Ottoman Empire
Ottoman Thrace
Political parties in the Ottoman Empire
Political parties established in 1908
Political parties disestablished in 1909
1908 establishments in the Ottoman Empire
Internal Macedonian Revolutionary Organization